Abducted: The Carlina White Story is a Lifetime television film about Carlina White, who was abducted as an infant by Ann Pettway from a New York hospital and solved her own kidnapping and reunited with her biological parents 23 years later. The case is reported to be the first known infant abduction from a New York hospital. On July 30, 2012, Pettway was sentenced in a New York court to 12 years in prison for kidnapping Carlina. The movie premiered on October 6, 2012.

Plot synopsis

In August 1987, new parents Joy White (Shepherd) and Carl Tyson (Cross) took their 19-day-old daughter Carlina to Harlem Hospital in New York City with a high fever. Ann Pettway (Ellis), who had suffered a series of miscarriages and was desperate for a baby, posed as a hospital nurse and walked out of the hospital with Carlina hidden from view. While Joy and Carl desperately searched for their daughter over the years, Pettway was raising Carlina (Palmer) as Nejdra "Netty" Nance in Bridgeport, Connecticut, a mere 45 miles from New York City. As Carlina grew older, she began to suspect that Ann was not her real mother and launched her own investigation. After contacting the National Center for Missing and Exploited Children, Carlina was reunited with her parents in January 2011. On July 30, 2012, following a trial, Pettway was found guilty for kidnapping Carlina and was sentenced to 12 years in prison.

Cast

Reception

Critical reception
Sandy Hoffman of AIDY Reviews said the film was an emotionless wreck that did not do the story justice. Laura Fries of Variety said the film felt a little incomplete.

Ratings
Abducted: The Carlina White Story earned 4.09 million viewers in its first airing on October 6, 2012, on Lifetime.

References

External links

2012 biographical drama films
2010s mystery films
2012 television films
2012 films
American biographical drama films
American mystery films
Canadian drama films
Canadian mystery films
English-language Canadian films
Films about child abduction in the United States
Films directed by Vondie Curtis-Hall
Films scored by Terence Blanchard
Films set in Connecticut
Films set in New York City
Films shot in British Columbia
Lifetime (TV network) films
American drama television films
2010s English-language films
2010s American films
2010s Canadian films